At the 1928 Summer Olympics in Amsterdam, eight events in gymnastics were contested.  For the first time at the Olympic Games, women competed in gymnastics.  The rope climbing and sidehorse vault events were dropped from the program.

Men's events

Women's events

Although extensive results detailing the performance of the men gymnasts, both teams and individuals, were published in the Official Olympic Report for these 1928 Summer Olympic Games, only the team results (both combined and with respect to exercise) were published for the women, providing no information whatsoever about the capacities of the various individual women who competed here.

Participating nations

Medal table

References

Sources
 

 
1928
1928 Summer Olympics events
1928 in gymnastics